The 2004 New York Jets season was the franchise's 35th season in the National Football League (NFL), the 45th season overall, and the fourth under head coach Herman Edwards.

The season began with the Jets attempting to improve on their 6–10 record from 2003. The Jets started the season by winning their first five games, which constituted a franchise record. They ultimately finished 10–6, and clinched the fifth seed in the playoffs, reaching the postseason for the third time in four seasons.

They upset the AFC West champion San Diego Chargers in the Wild Card round, winning in overtime 20–17, but would lose in the Divisional round to the Pittsburgh Steelers, also by a score 20–17 in overtime.

Offseason
The Jets signed former Arizona Cardinals cornerback David Barrett and offensive guard Pete Kendall, as well as Seattle Seahawks safety Reggie Tongue and Oakland Raiders linebacker Eric Barton. The Jets also traded for Tennessee Titans wide receiver Justin McCareins.

NFL Draft
The Jets were granted the 12th pick in the first round of the NFL Draft by virtue of their 6–10 record in 2003. They used this pick to take linebacker Jonathan Vilma from the University of Miami. They were also granted the maximum four compensatory draft picks as a result of losing premium free agents before the 2003 season.

Staff

Roster

Preseason

Regular season
During the 2004 regular season the Jets’ non-divisional, conference opponents were primarily from the AFC North, although they also played the Houston Texans from the AFC South, and the San Diego Chargers from the AFC West. Their non-conference opponents were from the NFC West.

Schedule

Note: Intra-division opponents are in bold text.

Game summaries

Week 1: vs. Cincinnati Bengals

The major story heading into this game was the professional debut of Bengal quarterback Carson Palmer. However, the Jets’ offense, led by running back Curtis Martin, spearheaded the Jets’ victory. After an early fumble led to a Bengals touchdown, the Jets took the lead late in the first quarter and never trailed. Martin ran for 196 yards and a touchdown, as well as a touchdown reception, and was an opening day record for Jets running backs. Quarterback Chad Pennington, making his first opening day start in his career, threw for 224 yards and two touchdowns and was an efficient 20-for-27 passing.

Week 2: at San Diego Chargers

The Jets got out to a 20-point lead before holding off a second-half comeback by San Diego. Two Curtis Martin touchdowns helped stake New York to a 17–0 lead, which grew to 27–7 after a field goal and a touchdown pass from Chad Pennington to Jerald Sowell. The Chargers finally responded late in the third quarter with a four-yard touchdown run from LaDainian Tomlinson, followed by a 33-yard touchdown pass from quarterback Drew Brees to Reche Caldwell. A one-yard touchdown pass from Pennington to Chris Baker in the fourth quarter put the game out of reach for San Diego.

Martin’s 119 yards made him the Jets’ all-time rushing leader, passing Freeman McNeil's mark of 8,074 yards.

Week 4: at Miami Dolphins

The Dolphins were looking for their first win while the Jets were looking to stay undefeated. Midway through the first quarter, Santana Moss returned a punt 24 yards to set up a 1-yard touchdown run by Curtis Martin. The Dolphins responded with 2 field goals. Leading 10–6 late in the 2nd quarter, Jets quarterback Chad Pennington was picked off by Arturo Freeman to set up a third Olindo Mare field goal and a 10–9 deficit. On Miami’s opening drive of the second half, quarterback Jay Fielder was intercepted by Donnie Abraham who returned in 66 yards for a touchdown putting the Jets ahead 17–9. That was all the cushion the Jets would need as the defense went on the force 3 more turnovers and hold on to beat the Dolphins keeping them undefeated at 3–0

Week 5: vs. Buffalo Bills

The Jets looked to go 4–0, while the Bills looked for their first win of the year. The Jets started off strong with a 61-yard drive to the Bills 11, however Doug Brien’s 29-yard field goal attempt on 4th down was wide left. Both teams traded punts before the Jets went on a 79-yard drive which took 4:12 off the clock and ended on a Chris Baker 1-yard touchdown reception from Pennington. Both teams traded punts once again before the Jets advanced to the Bills 19 and Doug Brien nailed a 37-yard field goal seconds before halftime. With 6:56 left in the 3rd Pennington hit Wayne Chrebet on a 27-yard catch which set up a 36-yard field goal by Brien. After a Bills punt Pennington led the Jets down the field before he was intercepted by Jeff Posey. The Bills then advanced 53 yards before Bledsoe hit Mark Campbell on a 16-yard touchdown. After a Jets punt, Bledsoe led the Bills on a 63-yard drive capped off on a 46-yard Lee Evans touchdown giving them the 14–13 lead with 6:58 left in the game. However, the Jets wouldn’t go down and went on a 60-yard drive which ended on a game winning Doug Brien 38-yard field goal with 59 seconds left in the game. The Bills were able to get to their own 48-yard line before Bledsoe threw a game sealing interception to Terrell Buckley with 2 seconds remaining in the game.

Week 6: vs. San Francisco 49ers

After the 1–4 Niners jumped to a 14–0 lead, the Jets clawed back as Lamont Jordan and Curtis Martin touchdowns (marred by two failed 2-point attempts) iced a 22–14 Jets lead and a 5–0 record.

Week 7: at New England Patriots

The Jets’ win streak ended in a 13–7 finalé and the Patriots’ league-record win streak reached 21 as David Patten’s touchdown catch from Tom Brady wrapped up the second quarter. From there neither team could score: the second half saw seven punts, a Dan Klecko fumble, and a failed fourth down attempt by the Jets.

Week 8: vs. Miami Dolphins

The Jets hosted the Dolphins on Monday Night Football and rebounded from their first loss of the year to pummel Miami 41–14.  Chad Pennington had three touchdown throws while Curtis Martin and Lamont Jordan added rushing scores; the Jets also intercepted Jay Fiedler twice.

Week 9: at Buffalo Bills

Willis McGahee led the Bills offense with 132 rushing yards and a touchdown as the Bills upended the Jets 22–17.  Drew Bledsoe had 184 passing yards and a score (to Lee Evans) while Chad Pennington had one touchdown and one pick; he had to come out and former Cowboy Quincy Carter completed two passes, one of them a 51-yard score to Santana Moss.

Week 10: vs. Baltimore Ravens

With Carter starting for injured Pennington, the Jets rushed to a 14–0 early lead on two Curtis Martin touchdowns, but Kyle Boller led the Ravens to a 17–14 lead on two touchdowns to Clarence Moore. The Jets tied it and in overtime Matt Stover won it for the Ravens (20–17 final) from 42 yards out.

Week 11: at Cleveland Browns

On a fourth quarter touchdown to Justin McCareins, Quincy Carter got his first win since his last season in Dallas as the Jets edged the Browns 10–7. Jeff Garcia managed a three-yard score to Aaron Shea but managed only 88 passing yards.

Week 12: at Arizona Cardinals

Former Dallas Cowboys Quincy Carter of the Jets and Emmitt Smith of the Cardinals squared off in a 13–3 Jets win. Carter had a 69-yard touchdown to Santana Moss while Smith was held to just 21 yards amid four Cardinals turnovers (two of them interceptions by Josh McCown).

Week 13: vs. Houston Texans

Chad Pennington returned and threw for 155 yards and two touchdowns as the Jets crushed the Texans 29–7, picking off David Carr twice.

Week 14: at Pittsburgh Steelers

The Steelers’ win streak under rookie Ben Roethlisberger continued as “Big Ben” threw for just 144 yards (and was intercepted twice), but the Jets performed worse; the Steelers intercepted Chad Pennington three times and the Jets committed twelve penalties (to two for Pittsburgh) as the Steelers won 17–6. Jerome Bettis ran in one touchdown and threw once for ten yards.

Week 15: vs. Seattle Seahawks

The Jets exploded to five touchdowns, three by Chad Pennington with a missed PAT and two rushing scores by Curtis Martin to rout the Seahawks 37–14; they gained 482 yards of offense to 275 yards for the Seahawks.

Week 16: vs. New England Patriots

New York area media had been critical of the Jets for their inability to beat quality opponents; Kevin Mawae and Pennington were sharp in responses to media criticism (said Mawae following the Jets’ win over Houston, referencing New York’s earlier defeat of the Chargers, “San Diego is 9–3.  We’re 9–3.   Is San Diego not a good team?”), but they fell flat against the Patriots, themselves smarting from an ugly loss in Miami the week earlier. Tom Brady had two touchdowns and Pennington was picked off twice as the Patriots won 23-7; the loss prevented the Jets from clinching a playoff spot.

Week 17: at St. Louis Rams

The Jets clinched a playoff spot despite failing 32–29 in overtime; they erased a 21–10 Rams lead as Chad Pennington and three Jets backs led by Curtis Martin’s 153 yards almost evenly split 361 yards in the air and on the ground.  Marc Bulger managed by himself to outgain the entire Jet offense with 450 passing yards and three touchdowns despite two picks.

Postseason

Schedule

Game summaries

AFC Wild Card Playoffs: at (4) San Diego Chargers

The Jets came into the game having lost 2 straight while San Diego was on a roll. The Jets started out the game well driving down the field on their opening drive only to see kicker Doug Brien miss a 33-yard field goal wide right. In the second quarter, Chargers quarterback Drew Brees found receiver Keenan McCardell for a 26-yard touchdown pass to give San Diego a 7–0. The Jets responded as Jets quarterback Chad Pennington found Anthony Becht for a 13-yard touchdown pass to tie the game. New York kept the momentum into the 3rd quarter as Santana Moss pulled in a perfect 46-yard touchdown pass from Pennington to give the Jets a 14–7 lead. The teams traded field goals. Then San Diego got the ball back with under 5:00 to play. The Chargers drove down to the Jets 3-yard line but faced a 4th and goal at the 3. Brees’ desperation pass was knocked down for an apparent Jets’ victory. However, a roughing the passer penalty on linebacker Eric Barton gave the Chargers a second chance, which they quickly seized as Brees found Antonio Gates for a 1-yard touchdown pass to send the game into overtime. 10 minutes into the extra period the Chargers were in position to win the game off the foot of rookie kicker Nate Kaeding. However, his 40-yard field goal sailed wide right as the Jets took advantage of their second chance driving down to the San Diego 8. Doug Brien connected on a 28-yard field goal to give the Jets the win and in the process advancing them to the next round to face the Steelers. Pennington’s numbers were very impressive as he was 23 of 33 for 279 and 2 TDs. Brees was 31 of 42 for 319 yards, 2 TDs and 1 interception.

AFC Divisional Round: at (1) Pittsburgh Steelers

The Pittsburgh Steelers were looking to make it 15 straight victories as they hosted the New York Jets in the AFC Divisional Round. Pittsburgh started out well as Jeff Reed hit a 45-yard field goal then Jerome Bettis plowed into the endzone from 3 yards out to give Pittsburgh a 10–0 lead. But New York stormed back. Following a field goal by kicker Doug Brien, Santana Moss took a punt return 75 yards for a touchdown to tie the game. Then late in the third quarter Reggie Tongue intercepted Ben Roethlisberger and returned it 86 yards for a touchdown to give the Jets a 17–10 lead. Pittsburgh responded midway through the fourth quarter as Hines Ward scored on a shovel pass to tie the game. Chad Pennington and the Jets offense was shut down for most of the game however drove down the field on the ensuing drive only to see it come to a disappointing halt as Doug Brien’s 47 field goal attempt hit the crossbar and falling just short. Doug Brien was given a chance to win the game on the last play of regulation but missed the 43-yard kick wide left sending the game into overtime. In overtime, Roethlisberger drove the Steelers 73 yards on 13 plays. Jeff Reed then connected on a 33-yard field goal, handing the Jets a defeat.

Standings

References

External links
Pro Football Reference

New York Jets seasons
New York Jets
New York Jets season
21st century in East Rutherford, New Jersey
Meadowlands Sports Complex